Michael Wayne Ryan (August 3, 1948 – May 24, 2015) was an American convicted murderer and white supremacist.

Criminal career
Ryan was the leader of a small, anti-government group that occupied a compound near Rulo, Nebraska, in the early 1980s. The group had loose ties to the Posse Comitatus and links to the Christian Identity movement. His teachings included the supremacy of the white race, antisemitism, and a distrust of all established earthly authority, including governments. For months, he and his followers committed burglaries under the cover of night reselling the items to financially support the group. They stockpiled weapons and supplies believing they would be needed during an imminent battle of Armageddon, assumed to occur in the form of a race war.

Ryan was arrested in 1985 after reports and a criminal investigation indicated that he had abused and killed five-year-old Luke Stice and later killed fellow group member James Thimm after he had tortured the latter for several days, beating him, whipping him, then shooting off his fingertips, skinning him alive, breaking his legs, and raping him with a shovel before finally stomping him to death.

Ryan was tried to a jury in Omaha, Nebraska after a change of venue. The jury convicted him of first degree murder and the court sentenced Ryan to death on April 10, 1986 and October 16, 1986, respectively. He claimed to be in direct contact with God and vowed to spend his days in prison rewriting the Bible, but he later recanted both statements. He died of natural causes (cancer) at the Tecumseh State Correctional Institution on death row on May 24, 2015.

Sources

References

External links

1948 births
2015 deaths
American murderers of children
American people convicted of murder
American prisoners sentenced to death
People convicted of murder by Nebraska
Prisoners sentenced to death by Nebraska
American people who died in prison custody
Prisoners who died in Nebraska detention
American white supremacists
Christian Identity
Cult leaders